Live at College Station Pennsylvania is a live album by John Hartford, released in 1995.

Reception

Writing for AllMusic, critic Brian Beatty wrote "Whether plucking his banjo, sawing away on his fiddle, or strumming his guitar, Hartford sounds happily at home throughout this entertaining set."

Track listing
All songs by John Hartford unless otherwise noted.
"I Wish We Had Our Time Again" – 2:47
"Gum Tree Canoe" (S. S. Steele) – 4:03
"Gentle on My Mind" – 3:19
"In Tall Buildings" – 3:13
"Wrong Road Again" (Allen Reynolds) – 2:10
"Bring Your Clothes Back Home" – 2:31
"Run Little Rabbit" (David Akeman) – 1:41
"Lorena" (Joseph Philbrick Webster, Henry DeLafayette Webster) – 4:04
"The Girl I Left Behind Me" – 2:42
"Learning to Smile All Over Again" – 4:23
"Cacklin' Hen" – 2:33
"I Would Not Be Here" – 2:15
"Boogie" – 3:48
"Old River Men" – 5:18
"Piece of My Heart" (Jerry Ragovoy, Bert Berns) – 3:33
"Natchez Whistle" – 4:22
"Julia Belle Swain"	  
"Skippin' in the Mississippi Dew" – 4:11

Personnel
John Hartford - vocals, fiddle, banjo, guitar

Production
John Hartford - producer
Mark Howard - producer, mixing, mastering
Dan Rudin - mastering
Tim Wendt - engineer

References

John Hartford albums
1995 live albums